The Silver Cross is a non-combat decoration of the Armed Forces of the Philippines which recognizes distinguished achievement or heroism in the conduct of intelligence operations not involving armed confrontations with the enemy. It is awarded by the Chief of Staff of the Armed Forces of the Philippines, or Unified Command and Major Service Commanders.

Description of the award 

The award is a silver cross surrounded by a garland consisting of two laurel leaves. A silver bar is superimposed on the horizontal section of the cross with the word "HEROISM." The ribbon is olive drab in color and has two small silver lines at the center.

Brief Background of the award. Upon instructions of then Colonel Victor S Ibrado PA, Group Commander, ISG, PA to determine an appropriate award specifically for successful intelligence operations between the MMM and the GCM, an award was drafted by then Captain Jose Ma Recaredo M Evidente III PA and endorsed for approval by Colonel Ibrado to HPA in mid 2000. It was revived and endorsed by now LtGen Victor S Ibrado AFP, then CG, PA to GHQ for approval in 2009. After 4 years of deliberations, the award was finally approved by SND in 2014.

References 

Military awards and decorations of the Philippines